The We Are Pioneers World Tour is the first headlining tour by American Country music group, The Band Perry. The tour is in support of their sophomore studio album, Pioneer. The tour began on November 8, 2013 in Gothenburg, Sweden and ended on October 3, 2014 in Primm, Nevada. We Are Pioneers... was first announced in August 2013.

Opening acts
Easton Corbin
Lindsay Ell

Setlist

"DONE.
"Night Gone Wasted"
"You Lie"
"All Your Life"
"I'm a Keeper"
"Forever Mind Nevermind"
"Hip to My Heart"/"Postcard from Paris"
"The Star-Spangled Banner" (Instrumental)
"Pioneer"
"Amazing Grace (cover)
"Timber" (Pitbull cover)
"Chainsaw"
"Fat Bottom Girls" (Queen cover)
"Double Heart"
"Don't Let Me Be Lonely"
Encore
"If I Die Young"
"Better Dig Two"

Tour dates

Notes

Box office score data

Critical reception
Kendra Meinert of the Green Bay Press Gazette says of the opening of the show, "It was a fabulous opening. A panel of three video screens led the crowd of 4,983 in a countdown, with the threesome emerging from the rolling smoke together on a platform before engaging their band members in a few choreographed dance moves, including a synchronized six-person jump line". "That exhilarating intro set the pace for an evening Kimberly promised would be part therapy and part recess, a leave-your-worries at the door celebration of "one loving country music family under this roof". And that it was — with an asterisk that this particular country family also happens to like to rock".

References

External links

2013 concert tours
2014 concert tours
The Band Perry concert tours